Merrill Nisker (born 11 November 1966), better known by her stage name Peaches, is a Canadian electroclash musician and producer.

Born in Ontario, Peaches began her musical career in the 1990s as part of a folk trio, Mermaid Cafe. In 1995, she established a rock band, the Shit. That year she also released her first solo album, Fancypants Hoodlum. After moving to Berlin, Germany, she was signed to the Kitty-Yo label and released her second album, The Teaches of Peaches (2000). Touring as the opening act for bands like Marilyn Manson and Queens of the Stone Age, she subsequently released her third album, Fatherfucker (2003).

Peaches' songs have been featured in films such as Mean Girls, Waiting..., Jackass Number Two, My Little Eye, Drive Angry, and Lost in Translation. Her music has also been featured on television shows such as Orphan Black, Lost Girl, The L Word, South Park, Skam, The Handmaid's Tale, 30 Rock, True Blood, Fresh Meat, Full Frontal with Samantha Bee, The Boys, Sex Education, and Letterkenny, and has been used for the promotion of Dirt. Peaches has performed guest vocals on several songs, including "Oh My God" from Pink's album Try This, "We Don't Play Guitars" from Chicks on Speed's album 99 Cents, "My Girls" from Christina Aguilera's 2010 album Bionic (produced by — and co-written with — Le Tigre), and "Scare Me" from Major Lazer's 2013 album Free the Universe (also featuring Timberlee).

Early life 
Merrill Nisker was born in 1966 in Toronto, Ontario. Her family was culturally Jewish, though not religious. Her maternal grandparents immigrated to Canada from Ustrzyki Dolne in Poland; her paternal grandparents were from Galicia in what is now Ukraine.

Nisker attended a private Jewish school. Nisker was a class clown, who "wasn't particularly smart. I was interested in creative performance stuff, but that turned out to be difficult for me because it was all so structured," she told Kitty Empire of The Observer.

In an interview in URB magazine, she recounted how growing up she experienced antisemitism; on her walks home from school, students from a nearby Catholic school would throw stones at her and call her a "dirty Jew".

As a teenager, Nisker appeared in two plays alongside future Barenaked Ladies singer Steven Page, including a musical, My Brother's Keeper. She shared this story with Damian Abraham on his Turned Out a Punk podcast.

Peaches is bisexual.

Career

1990–1999: Mermaid Cafe, Fancypants Hoodlum, the Shit 
During the early 1990s, Nisker was part of folk trio Mermaid Cafe. The name was taken from the Joni Mitchell song "Carey". She later released her first solo album, Fancypants Hoodlum, under the name Merrill Nisker in 1995, and subsequently developed the style and persona known as Peaches. In 1995, she started the Shit, a noisy four-piece combo with Chilly Gonzales (a.k.a. Jason Beck), bassist Sticky (later of Weeping Tile and Music Maul), and Dominique Salole (a.k.a. Mocky). Their absurd, highly sexual rock music was a harbinger for what Nisker would become, as it was during this time that she adopted the Peaches name. The Peaches moniker was taken from the Nina Simone song "Four Women" where Simone screams at the end, "My name is Peaches!" In Toronto, before rising to fame, she lived above the sex shop Come as You Are with fellow recording artist Feist. Feist worked the back of the stage at Peaches' shows, using a sock puppet and calling herself "Bitch Lap Lap". The two toured together in England from 2000–2001, staying with Justine Frischmann of Elastica and M.I.A. M.I.A. went on to video-document Peaches' 2000 US tour and made clothes for the musician, while Peaches inspired M.I.A. to use the Roland MC-505 in her own compositions.

2000–2002: The Teaches of Peaches 
After creating a six-track EP, Lovertits, Peaches moved to Berlin, Germany. While visiting her old friend Jason Beck, who was enjoying modest European success as Chilly Gonzales in his new home base of Berlin, Peaches landed a one-night gig. On the merits of that show alone, Berlin's Kitty-Yo label signed her on the spot. The label offered her the chance to record a new album, The Teaches of Peaches, back home in Toronto, and the already-completed Lovertits EP was released in the summer of 2000. The full-length album The Teaches of Peaches, was released that fall. The album contains her signature song "Fuck the Pain Away".

Peaches appeared on the British TV show Top of the Pops, but her performance was deemed too racy to be aired.

Nisker signed a European contract with Sony following the release of The Teaches of Peaches. She later made a big-budget video for the song "Set It Off", in which she sat in a locker room as her pubic and armpit hair grew to Rapunzel length. Sony subsequently dropped her. "Now they want their money back," Peaches said.

In 2001, Nisker's 34AA bust was one of the first female busts cast by famous 1960s groupie Cynthia Plaster Caster, who was better known for making molds of male rockers' genitalia.

In 2002, Peaches appeared in "Hideous Man", a short film directed by John Malkovich. The short was created as a showcase for clothing designed by Bella Freud, and featured the poetry of Gary Sinise.

2003–2005: Fatherfucker 
In 2003, Peaches released her second album Fatherfucker on XL/Kitty-Yo after years of touring and opening for artists like Marilyn Manson and Queens of the Stone Age. She once again wrote and programmed all of the album's music herself. The single "Kick It", which features Iggy Pop, was described by Peaches to Rolling Stone as "more about rock 'n' roll than sex."

For her album Fatherfucker, Peaches was nominated in the "Outstanding Music Artist" category for the 15th GLAAD Media Awards along with Rufus Wainwright, Meshell Ndegeocello, Junior Senior, and Bitch and Animal, but lost to Wainwright.

2006–2008: Impeach My Bush 

In 2007 Peaches posed as a model for an advertisement by the Vestal Watches company. The advertisement was shown in The Fader magazine.

Peaches was nominated for her album Impeach My Bush in the category "Outstanding Music Artist" at the 18th GLAAD Media Awards along with the Ditty Bops, Owen Pallett, Pet Shop Boys, and the Scissor Sisters, but lost to the Scissor Sisters.

Peaches' song "Boys Wanna Be Her" is featured in an online teaser for the live-action feature film Bad Kids Go to Hell (2012), based on the best-selling graphic novel of the same name. It also serves as the theme music for the late-night television series Full Frontal with Samantha Bee. It was also featured in an episode of Orphan Black.

2009–2012: I Feel Cream and other work 
Peaches' fourth album I Feel Cream, was released on 4 May 2009, in Europe, and 5 May in North America. The first single from the album is a double A-side of "Talk to Me" and "More". Peaches enlisted some of her contemporaries to co-produce a number of tracks including Simian Mobile Disco, Soulwax, Digitalism and Shapemod. Long time friend and collaborator Chilly Gonzales co-wrote some of the songs on I Feel Cream and Shunda K (the voice of Yo Majesty) featured on the track "Billionaire".

Peaches has been noted for her stage costumes and flamboyant sense of style. Her looks are often both nostalgic and futuristic; aggressive and glamorous; and push the limits of gender identity. Peaches and her band Sweet Machine wear costumes from a variety of designers but most notably she works closely with stylist/designer Vaughan Alexander, celebrity hairstylist Charlie Le Mindu, and young American fashion designer, John Renaud.

In 2010, Peaches and backing band Sweet Machine once again toured Australia performing at the sold out Big Day Out (BDO) festivals and at a series of sideshows. Peaches was supported on this tour by Shunda K who performed her collaboration "Billionaire" at BDO festivals and at the sideshows, and was also the opening act at the sideshows along with Evil Beaver in Melbourne.

On 14 March 2010, Peaches won the 'Electronic Artist of the Year' award at the 10th Annual Independent Music Awards held in Toronto, Canada.

In March 2010, the copyright owners of the musical Jesus Christ Superstar denied Peaches permission to perform her one-woman version that she was planning to stage in Berlin. After receiving the attention of several media outlets, Peaches successfully negotiated with those rights-holders, and the musical was performed on 25–27 March at Berlin's HAU1. Gonzales accompanied Peaches on piano. Travis Jeppesen stated in his review for Artforum, "Not only did Peaches set it off, she managed to surprise us all by showing off an expansive vocal range, a musician's natural sensitivity to the dynamics of Andrew Lloyd Webber's score, and an emotive prowess that is rarely if ever displayed in her own, less holy, music."

Peaches appeared in a film called Ivory Tower, which also includes spots from Feist, Chilly Gonzales, Tiga and Gonzales' mother. Peaches stars as Marsha, a performance artist engaged to a man named Thaddeus (Tiga). Things get complicated when her ex, Hershall (Gonzales) comes back into her life. The film is set in Toronto and was shot over 13 days in late winter and early spring 2010. It was co-written by Gonzales and Céline Sciamma (who directed/wrote Water Lilies and Portrait of a Lady on Fire) was directed by Adam Traynor and produced by Nicolas Kazarnia. Ivory Tower was given a limited theatrical release in August 2010.

In May 2010, Christina Aguilera announced that Peaches was among the collaborators on her fourth studio album Bionic. Peaches is featured on a track called "My Girls". The song was co-written and produced by Le Tigre.

On 30 August 2010, Peaches released a new single titled "Jonny". The single is part of a tribute series to Alan Vega from the band Suicide. Other musicians who have released tribute singles as part of the series include The Horrors, Primal Scream, Klaxons and Bruce Springsteen.

Peaches also appears as a guest musician on R.E.M.'s 2011 release Collapse into Now, contributing vocals to the song "Alligator_Aviator_Autopilot_Antimatter".

2012: New music and Peaches Does Herself 
It was announced in 2012 that a semi-biographical musical/concert film would be premièred at the Toronto Film Festival, utilising 22 songs from Peaches' back catalog and backed by her band the Sweet Machine.

Peaches Does Herself premiered at the Toronto International Film Festival on 13 September 2012.

On 2 October 2012, Peaches released her new single "Burst!" as a digital single backed with several remixes.

2015–2021: What Else Is in the Teaches of Peaches and Rub 

Photographer Holger Talinski collaborated with Peaches on a book of photographs, What Else Is in the Teaches of Peaches, released on 2 June 2015. The book, published by Akashic Books, also includes text written by Peaches, R.E.M. lead singer Michael Stipe, artist and singer Yoko Ono and actor Elliot Page.

Peaches' sixth studio album, Rub, was released 25 September 2015. It was produced by Vice Cooler with Peaches in her Los Angeles garage. In June 2015 it was announced to contain guest vocal appearances by Kim Gordon, Feist, and Simonne Jones.

An unused track from the Rub sessions titled "Bodyline" was released by Adult Swim on 20 July 2015. The Vice Cooler-produced track features Nick Zinner on guitar and was described as "a heavy, chugging guitar line over which Peaches half raps, half sings a high-octane space jam." In May 2016, Peaches appeared in a fourth-season episode of the Canadian TV series Orphan Black as herself, performing "Bodyline" in a club. She performed "Boys Wanna Be Her" at the Not the White House Correspondents' Dinner on 29 April 2017. In February 2019, Peaches made her debut with the Staatstheater Stuttgart, co-directing and performing as Anna I in Kurt Weill's/Bertolt Brecht's Die sieben Todsünden.

2022: Upcoming seventh studio album 
Peaches will go on tour in 2022 to mark the 20th anniversary of The Teaches of Peaches. She is also working on her seventh studio album. Peaches' song "Boys Wanna Be Her" is featured in the 2022 film The 355 starring Jessica Chastain and Diane Kruger.

Art 
Taking a bold and unexpected approach to the topics of sex, feminism, queerness, gender, and new millennium politics, Peaches calls her WJIT presentation "a deconstructed musical in 14 scenes". At the heart of this presentation are the "Fleshies", who have renamed themselves as such to rewrite their narrative, break away from humans and human interactions, do away with words like "sex toys" and "masturbators" in a quest to find sexual equality amongst themselves.

Themes 
Gender identity is one theme of Peaches' music, often playing with traditional notions of gender roles representation. Her lyrics and live shows consciously blur the distinction between male and female; for example, she appears on the cover of her album Fatherfucker with a full beard. When asked if she had chosen the title for shock value, she commented:

She disputes accusations of "penis envy", preferring the term "hermaphrodite envy", since "there is so much male and female in us all."

Age has been another theme of Peaches' music in recent years. The lyrics from several songs from her 2009 album I Feel Cream tackle the issue of age, including "Trick or Treat" ("you lick my crow's feet"), "Show Stopper" ("Never mind my age, it's like we're breaking out of a cage") and "Mommy Complex". Peaches has criticized ageism directed against her, telling the New York Daily News that "I'm going to make aging cool."

Inspiration 
Peaches lists John Waters, Cindy Sherman, Paul McCarthy and the films Tron, Grease, Liquid Sky and Phantom of the Paradise as inspiration for the visuals in her live shows.

Discography

Albums 
 Fancypants Hoodlum (1995)
 The Teaches of Peaches (2000)
 Fatherfucker (2003)
 Impeach My Bush (2006)
 I Feel Cream (2009)
 Rub (2015)

Filmography

Film

Television

Awards and nominations

See also 
 List of electroclash bands and artists

References

External links 

 
 

 
1966 births
Artists from Toronto
Bisexual women
Bisexual musicians
Bisexual feminists
Canadian dance musicians
Canadian electronic musicians
Canadian expatriates in Germany
Canadian women guitarists
Canadian feminists
20th-century Canadian multi-instrumentalists
Canadian people of Polish-Jewish descent
Canadian people of Ukrainian-Jewish descent
Canadian performance artists
Canadian record producers
Canadian women singer-songwriters
Canadian singer-songwriters
Canadian women artists
Electroclash
Feminist musicians
Independent Music Awards winners
Keytarists
Jewish Canadian musicians
Jewish feminists
Jewish singers
Jewish songwriters
Kitty-Yo artists
LGBT Jews
Canadian LGBT singers
LGBT record producers
Living people
Musicians from Toronto
Sex-positive feminists
XL Recordings artists
Canadian women in electronic music
21st-century Canadian multi-instrumentalists
20th-century Canadian guitarists
21st-century Canadian guitarists
20th-century Canadian keyboardists
21st-century Canadian keyboardists
20th-century Canadian bass guitarists
21st-century Canadian bass guitarists
Canadian DJs
Theremin players
20th-century Canadian women singers
21st-century Canadian women singers
Electronic dance music DJs
Canadian women record producers
20th-century Canadian LGBT people
21st-century Canadian LGBT people
20th-century women guitarists
21st-century women guitarists